Qasr (also Romanized as Qaşr; also known as Ghasr) is a village in Azizabad Rural District, in the Central District of Narmashir County, Kerman Province, Iran. At the 2006 census, its population was 572, in 127 families.

References 

Populated places in Narmashir County